Slack Head, sometimes written Slackhead, is a hamlet near Beetham, South Lakeland, Cumbria, England. It is in Beetham civil parish. It is a purely residential area, with a postbox as its only facility. It is the location of a small shrine to Saint Lioba (or Leoba) built into a wall. The Fairy Steps, a natural staircase in a limestone crag, lie in woodland to the northwest of the hamlet.

References

Hamlets in Cumbria
Beetham